Matthew David Cutler (born 30 October 1973) is an English dancer and former World Amateur Latin-American champion. He was a professional dancer on the BBC dancing show Strictly Come Dancing.

Early life
Cutler was born in Chelmsford, Essex. His brother designs all his clothes, personal and professional. When he was four, his family moved to Southend on Sea, Essex, where he went to Earls Hall Primary School and Cecil Jones Secondary School, now Cecil Jones Academy. He started dancing classes in a church hall in Southend and took part in school competitions and other competitions in Chelmsford.

By the age of ten, he was winning most competitions and a judge suggested that he entered more challenging competitions. Cutler took ballroom lessons in Birmingham and Latin classes in Hendon and took part in open competitions, supported by his parents.

He won the World Amateur Championship with his then wife Nicole Cutler in 1999, and went on to win many other competitions. They were later divorced in 2003, and went on to work with different professional partners, reuniting in 2006. In October 2009, the Cutlers started the Semley Club Dance Academy in Norbury, South London, United Kingdom, where they teach dance.

Strictly Come Dancing

Cutler joined the third series of Strictly Come Dancing in 2005, when he and Siobhan Hayes left in week one. He partnered Carol Smillie in 2006, reaching week nine, and won the competition in 2007 with partner Alesha Dixon. In January/February 2008, Matthew competed with ex Olympian Denise Lewis on the Strictly Come Dancing Tour.

He partnered Christine Bleakley in the series of 2008, and finished fifth overall. In January/February 2009. Matthew danced with Kristina Rihanoff on the Strictly Come Dancing Tour. For the series of 2009 of Strictly, Matthew partnered Tennis ace Martina Hingis.

He and Martina were the first couple to leave the series of 2009. His professional partner for 2009 was Aliona Vilani. He did not return for the eighth series in Autumn 2010, but returned for the Christmas special, partnering Fern Britton.

Awards
He has twice received the Carl Alan Award for an outstanding contribution to dance.

Professional
 Strictly Come Dancing champion (partnered with Alesha Dixon), 2007
 World, Open British, International and UK Professional Latin finalist, 2000–2005
 International Professional Latin finalist, 2004
 World and European Professional Latin finalist, 2005
 British Closed Professional Latin Champion, 2004
 UK Closed Professional Latin Champion, 2000, 2002, 2004, 2005
 World Masters Professional Latin Champion, 2000

Amateur
 UK Open Amateur Champion 2000
 Open British Amateur Champions 1997, 1999
 World, European & International Amateur Champion 1999
 Closed British Amateur Champions 1995, 1996, 1997, 1999
 Closed UK Amateur Champions 1995, 1996, 1997, 1998, 1999
 Dutch Open Amateur Latin Champions 1998, 1999
 South African Open Amateur Champions 1990, 1994

Television appearances
 Come Dancing (1992–1995, 1998)
 International Come Dancing (1996)
 Burn The Floor (1999)
 Strictly Come Dancing (2005–2009)
 Diet On The Dancefloor (2008)
 Ready Steady Cook (2009)

References

 (Registration required)

External links
Matthew Cutler -agent and latest news -

1973 births
Living people
British ballroom dancers
English male dancers
Strictly Come Dancing winners
21st-century British dancers
20th-century British dancers